Flavius Lucian Băd (born 24 May 1983) is a Romanian football player who plays for Liga IV side Victoria Zăbrani.

References

External links
 
 

1983 births
Living people
Romanian footballers
Association football forwards
Liga I players
Liga II players
FC Politehnica Timișoara players
FC Progresul București players
FC UTA Arad players
FC Universitatea Cluj players
ACF Gloria Bistrița players
CS Național Sebiș players
CS Șoimii Pâncota players
Sportspeople from Arad, Romania